The Church of the Sacred Heart, is a Catholic church in Richmond, Virginia that was built in 1901. The congregation was initially an Irish and German congregation.

It was listed on the National Register of Historic Places in 2002.

References

External links
Church website
Image of the church

Roman Catholic churches in Richmond, Virginia
German-American culture in Virginia
Irish-American culture in Virginia
Churches on the National Register of Historic Places in Virginia
Renaissance Revival architecture in Virginia
Roman Catholic churches completed in 1901
National Register of Historic Places in Richmond, Virginia
20th-century Roman Catholic church buildings in the United States